The 1971 International Championship for Makes season was the 19th season of FIA World Sportscar Championship motor racing. It was open to Group 6 Sports Prototypes, Group 5 Sportscars, and Group 4 Special GT Cars and was contested over an eleven race series which ran from 10 January to 24 July 1971. Porsche won the championship, and the German manufacturer also won the International Cup for GT Cars.

Schedule

 

† - Sports Prototypes and Sportscars only, GT class did not participate.

Season results

Races

Championship results

International Championship for Makes
Championship points were awarded to the top 6 finishers in each race in the order of 9-6-4-3-2-1.  Manufacturers were only given points for their highest finishing car and any other cars from that manufacturer were merely skipped in the points standings.

All Sportscars, Sports Prototypes and GT cars were eligible for points towards the International Championship for Makes and the GT class also had their own separate award.

Cars participating in races that were not included in the Sportscar, Sports Prototype or GT classes were skipped when awarding points for the overall championship.

Only the best 8 points finishes counted towards the championship, with any other points earned not included in the total. Discarded points are shown within brackets.

International Cup for GT Cars
The GT class did not participate in Rounds 1 and 4.  Only the best 7 finishes were counted towards the International Cup for GT Cars. Discarded points are shown within brackets.

The cars
The following models contributed to the net points scores of their respective manufacturers.

International Championship for Makes
 Porsche 917K & Porsche 908/3
 Alfa Romeo T33/3
 Ferrari 512M, Ferrari 512S & Ferrari 312PB
 Lola T70 Mk.3B Chevrolet & Lola T212 Ford
 Chevrolet Corvette

International Cup for GT Cars
 Porsche 911S
 Chevrolet Corvette
 Opel GT
 Alfa Romeo GTA

References

External links
 World Sportscar Championship at www.classicscars.com

World Sportscar Championship seasons
World Sportscar